The David di Donatello for Best Sound is a film award presented annually by the Accademia del Cinema Italiano (ACI, Academy of Italian Cinema) to recognize outstanding efforts on the part of sound technicians who have worked within the Italian film industry during the year preceding the ceremony. Born in the 1988 edition of the David di Donatello award show as David di Donatello for Best Sound Engineer, from the 2017 edition onward, it has been called David di Donatello for Best Sound in order to recognize all sound technicians.

Winners and nominees
Winners are indicated in bold.

1980s
1988
 Raffaele De Luca - Ultimo minuto

1989
 Candido Raini - Mignon Has Come to Stay

1990s
1990
 Remo Ugolinelli - Open Doors

1991
 Tiziano Crotti - Mediterraneo (ex aequo)
 Remo Ugolinelli - Ultra (ex aequo)

1992
 Gaetano Carito - The Rubber Wall

1993
 Remo Ugolinelli - The Escort

1994
 Tullio Morganti - Sud
 Benito Alchimede - Let's Not Keep in Touch
 Franco Borni - Caro diario

1995
 Alessandro Zanon - Lamerica
 Mario Iaquone and Daghi Rondanini - Nasty Love
 Tullio Morganti - No Skin

1996
 Giancarlo Laurenzi - Palermo - Milan One Way
 Massimo Loffredi - The Star Maker
 Alessandro Zanon - The Second Time

1997
 Tullio Morganti - Nirvana
 Maurizio Argentieri - The Prince of Homburg
 Gaetano Carito - A Cold, Cold Winter
 Tiziano Crotti - Sacred Silence
 Bruno Pupparo - My Generation

1998
 Tullio Morganti - Ovosodo
 Tullio Morganti - Life Is Beautiful
 Alessandro Zanon - April

1999
 Gaetano Carito - Radiofreccia
 Amedeo Casati - Not of this World
 Bruno Pupparo - Marriages

2000s
2000
 Maurizio Argentieri - Bread and Tulips
 Tullio Morganti - Il dolce rumore della vita
 Bruno Pupparo - But Forever in My Mind

2001
 Gaetano Carito - The Last Kiss
 Fulgenzio Ceccon - One Hundred Steps
 Alessandro Zanon - The Son's Room

2002
 Remo Ugolinelli - Light of My Eyes

2003
 Andrea Giorgio Moser - El Alamein: The Line of Fire
 Maurizio Argentieri - Casomai
 Gaetano Carito - Remember Me, My Love
 Gaetano Carito - Maximum Velocity (V-Max)
 Marco Grillo - Facing Windows

2004
 Fulgenzio Ceccon - The Best of Youth
 Gaetano Carito - Good Morning, Night
 Mario Iaquone - Don't Move
 Mauro Lazzaro - I'm Not Scared
 Miguel Polo - What Will Happen to Us

2005
 Alessandro Zanon - The Keys to the House
 Mario Dallimonti - Alla luce del sole
 Gaetano Carito and Pierpaolo Merafino - Manual of Love
 Marco Grillo - Cuore Sacro
 Daghi Rondanini and Emanuele Cecere - The Consequences of Love

2006
 Alessandro Zanon - The Caiman
 Benito Alchimede and Maurizio Grassi - Notte prima degli esami
 Gaetano Carito - My Best Enemy
 Mario Iaquone - Romanzo Criminale
 Bruno Pupparo - The Beast in the Heart

2007
 Bruno Pupparo - My Brother Is an Only Child
 Mario Iaquone - Along the Ridge
 Pierre Yves Labouè - Nuovomondo
 Gilberto Martinelli - The Unknown Woman
 Marco Grillo - Saturn in Opposition

2008
 Alessandro Zanon  - The Girl by the Lake
 Gaetano Carito - Quiet Chaos
 François Musy - Days and Clouds
 Bruno Pupparo - Black and White
 Remo Ugolinelli - The Right Distance

2009
 Maricetta Lombardo  - Gomorrah
 Emanuele Cecere - Il divo
 Marco Fiumara - Many Kisses Later
 Gaetano Carito, Marco Grillo, and Bruno Pupparo - Italians
 Bruno Pupparo - Si può fare

2010s
2010
 Carlo Missidenti  - The Man Who Will Come
 Faouzi Thabet - Baarìa
 Bruno Pupparo - Genitori & figli - Agitare bene prima dell'uso
 Mario Iaquone - The First Beautiful Thing
 Gaetano Carito - Vincere

2011
 Bruno Pupparo  - La nostra vita
 Mario Iaquone - 20 Cigarettes
 Francesco Liotard - Basilicata Coast to Coast
 Paolo Benvenuti and Simone Paolo Olivero - Le quattro volte
 Gaetano Carito and Maricetta Lombardo - Noi credevamo

2012
 Benito Alchimede and Brando Mosca - Caesar Must Die
 Gilberto Martinelli - ACAB – All Cops Are Bastards
 Alessandro Zanon - We Have a Pope
 Fulgenzio Ceccon - Piazza Fontana: The Italian Conspiracy
 Ray Cross and William Sarokin - This Must Be the Place

2013
 Remo Ugolinelli and Alessandro Palmerini  - Diaz – Don't Clean Up This Blood
 Gaetano Carito and Pierpaolo Merafino - Dormant Beauty
 Fulgenzio Ceccon - Long Live Freedom
 Maricetta Lombardo - Reality
 Gilberto Martinelli - The Best Offer

2014
 Roberto Mozzarelli  - Human Capital
 Maurizio Argentieri - Those Happy Years
 Angelo Bonanni - I Can Quit Whenever I Want
 Emanuele Cecere - The Great Beauty
 Marco Grillo and Mirko Pantalla - Fasten Your Seatbelts

2015
 Stefano Campus - Black Souls
 Remo Ugolinelli - An Italian Name
 Alessandro Zanon - Mia Madre
 Gilberto Martinelli - The Invisible Boy
 Francesco Liotard - Greenery Will Bloom Again

2016
 Angelo Bonanni - Don't Be Bad
 Umberto Montesanti - Perfect Strangers
 Maricetta Lombardo - Tale of Tales
 Valentino Giannì - They Call Me Jeeg
 Emanuele Cecere - Youth

2017
 Angelo Bonanni, Diego De Santis, Mirko Perri, and Michele Mazzucco - Italian Race
 Valentino Giannì, Fabio Conca, Sandro Rossi, Omar Abouzaid, Lilio Rosato, and Francesco Cucinelli - Indivisible
 Filippo Porcari, Federica Ripani, Claudio Spinelli, Marco Marinelli, and Massimo Marinelli - La stoffa dei sogni
 Alessandro Bianchi, Luca Novelli, Daniela Bassani, Fabrizio Quadroli, and Gianni Pallotto - Like Crazy
 Gaetano Carito, Pierpaolo Lorenzo, Lilio Rosato, Roberto Cappannelli, and Gianluca Basili - Sweet Dreams

2018
 Adriano Di Lorenzo, Alberto Padoan, Marc Bastien, Eric Grattepain, and Franco Piscopo - Nico, 1988
 Giuseppe Tripodi, Florian Fabre, and Julien Perez - A Ciambra
 Giancarlo Rutigliano, Andrea Cutillo, and Giorgio Molfini - Cinderella the Cat
 Lavinia Burcheri, Simone Costantino, Claudio Spinelli, Gianluca Basili, Sergio Basili, Antonio Tirinelli, and Nadia Paone - Ammore e malavita
 Fabio Conca, Giuliano Marcaccini, Daniele De Angelis, Giuseppe D'Amato, Antonio Giannantonio, Dario Calvari, and Alessandro Checcacci - Napoli velata

2019
 Maricetta Lombardo, Alessandro Molaioli, Davide Favargiotti, Mirko Perri, Mauro Eusepi, and Michele Mazzucco - Dogman
 Yves-Marie Omnes, Thomas Gastinel, Davide Favargiotti, Jean-Pierre Laforce - Call Me by Your Name
 Alessandro Zanon, Alessandro Palmerini, Alessandro Piazzese, Marta Billingsley, Stefano Grosso, Marzia Cordò, Giancarlo Rutigliano, and Paolo Segat - Capri-Revolution
 Christophe Giovannoni, Julien D'Esposito, Marta Billingsley, and François Musy - Happy as Lazzaro
 Emanuele Cecere, Francesco Sabez, Paolo Testa, Silvia Moraes, Alessandro Feletti, Alessandro Quaglio, Mirko Perri, Mauro Eusepi, and Marco Saitta - Loro

2020s
2020
 Angelo Bonanni, Davide D'Onofrio, Mirko Perri, Mauro Eusepi, and Michele Mazzucco - The First King: Birth of an Empire
 Daniele Maraniello, Max Gobiet, Giuseppe D'Amato, Francesco Albertelli, and Marcos Molina - 5 Is the Perfect Number
 Denny de Angelis, Simone Panetta, Stefano Grosso, and Michael Kaczmarek - Martin Eden
 Maricetta Lombardo, Luca Novelli, Daniela Bassani, Stefano Grosso, and Gianni Pallotto - Pinocchio
 Gaetano Carito, Adriano Di Lorenzo, Pierpaolo Merafino, Lilio Rosato, Gianluca Basili, and Francesco Tumminello - The Traitor

References

External links
 
 David di Donatello official website

Sound
Film sound awards